The Albania national under-21 football team is the national under-21 football team of Albania and is controlled by the Football Association of Albania. The team competes in the European Under-21 Football Championship, which is held every two years.

Following the realignment of UEFA's youth competitions in 1976, the Albanian under-21 team was formed.

History

Balkan Youth Championship 

Albania Under-21 participated in the Balkan Youth Championship as a succeder of Under-23 team, in the 1976–78 and 1981 competitions, winning both with finals against Romania and Bulgaria. Notably in 1978, the second leg of the final match against Romania was characterized by a large Albania's win 7–1, which is the largest win ever recorded by Albania U-21.

1984 UEFA European Under-21 Football Championship

In 1978 a Competition for the European Under-21 teams was created but the Albania Under-21s didn't participated in first 3 editions and debutted in the competition in the 1984s Championship where they managed to qualify for the first and only time in their history although they were competing for the first time in such tournament. The historic event was the first time any Albanian squad qualified for a Europe or World Championship, and only the fifth time any Albanian squad qualified for the major championships. To this day the team that qualified for that competition are still regarded as the most successful team in Albanian football history. In the qualifying stage they were drawn in a very tough group which included the West Germany, Turkey and Austria. Albania U21 managed to qualify without losing a single game winning both home-away versus Austria (1–2 away & 3–0 home) & Turkey (both 1–0) and managing two very good draws against one of the biggest and best footballing nations, West Germany (both 1–1), heading the group with 10 points, 1 above West Germany. Albania played the quarter finals against Italy, against which it lost twice 0–1 both home and away as Italy advanced to the semifinals losing against England, the eventual champions.

1986–1994
In the 1986 UEFA European Under-21 Football Championship Albania came last in group after Poland and Greece, and could not qualify. In the 1988 UEFA European Under-21 Football Championship Albania came again last in group after Spain, Romania and Austria. In the 1990 UEFA European Under-21 Football Championship Albania came last in group after Sweden, England and Poland. In the 1992 UEFA European Under-21 Football Championship managed to precede Iceland as last in the group, but was preceded by Czechoslovakia, France and Spain. In the qualifiers of the 1994 UEFA European Under-21 Football Championship Albania preceded bottom team Republic of Ireland, but was preceded by Spain, Germany and Denmark.

1996–2002
In the 1996 UEFA European Under-21 Football Championship qualification Albania did not participate. In the qualifiers of the 1998 UEFA European Under-21 Football Championship Albania left behind Armenia, but had to trail in the final rankings Germany, Ukraine, and Portugal. In the qualifiers of the 2000 UEFA European Under-21 Football Championship Albania trailed Greece, Norway, Georgia, Latvia, and Slovenia and closed at the bottom of the group. In the qualifiers of the 2002 UEFA European Under-21 Football Championship Albania came again last behind England, Greece, Germany, and Finland.

2004–2007
In the qualifiers of the 2004 UEFA European Under-21 Football Championship Albania had the best result since Euro '84, when it had won the group, as it left two teams behind (Republic of Ireland and Georgia), but was preceded by Switzerland and Russia, and thus failed to qualify to the main tournament. In the qualifiers of the 2006 UEFA European Under-21 Football Championship Albania left behind itself Kazakhstan, but was preceded by Denmark, Ukraine, Greece, Turkey, and Georgia. In the qualifiers of the 2007 UEFA European Under-21 Football Championship, in a 3 teams group, Albania came last behind Spain and Slovakia and failed to qualify.

2009–2013
In the qualifiers of the 2009 UEFA European Under-21 Football Championship Albania was fourth out of 6 teams in the final ranking, leaving behind the Faroe Islands and Azerbaijan, but trailing behind Italy, Croatia and Greece. In the qualifiers of the 2011 UEFA European Under-21 Football Championship Albania left again behind Azerbaijan but trailed Scotland, Belarus, and Austria in the final rankings. In the qualifiers of the 2013 UEFA European Under-21 Football Championship Albania came last trailing behind Russia, Portugal, Poland, and Moldova. However, as a consolation for the first time an Albanian footballer, Armando Sadiku was the top goalscorer of the group. Albania drew in Russia against the famous hosts during that tournament, a noticeable fact. Albania were also able to drew against Portugal in Durres with 2-2 during this qualifying. Albania suffered close loses against Poland in Grudziądz with 4-3 and to Russia with 0–1 in Durres respectively.

2015-2019  
In the qualification in Group 4 Albania would finish in last place. They were able to beat Hungary with 0–2 away from home. Albania would also beat notable Austria with 1–3 away from home in the Liebenauer Stadium in Graz.  As a fact Albanian won for the first time in their history more matches away than at home in an Under-21 qualification. In the following  2017 UEFA European Under-21 Championship qualification Group 4. Albania finished fourth leaving Hungary and Liechtenstein but trailing behind Greece, Israel and eventual Group winners Portugal. securing 12 points in the progress. Albania were able to win three matches in this qualifying. They beat Liechtenstein with 2-0 and away from home with the same result. As well as beating Hungary in Elbasan with 2–1 in fact. They drew three times once against Israel in Elbasan with 1-1 and away to Hungary with 2-2 and in the derby at home against Greece with 0:0.

Competitive record

Note: The year of the tournament represents the year in which it ends.

Fixtures and results

Players

Current squad
The following players were called up for the friendly matches against Azerbaijan and Poland, on 23 and 27 March 2023.
All caps and goals as of 20 November 2022 after match against Montenegro.
Players in bold have been called up or have played at least one full international match with national senior team.

Recent call-ups
The following players have been called up for the team within the last 12 months and are still available for selection.

Notes
U17 = Was called up from national under-17 squad.
U19 = Was called up from national under-19 squad.
INJ = The player is not part of the current squad due to injury.

Coaching staff
Current coaching staff:

Competitive record

UEFA European Under-23 Championship

The event was classified as a U-23 tournament where at time were played three competitions, 1972, 1974 & 1976.

UEFA U-21 Championship Record

*Denotes draws include knockout matches decided on penalty kicks.

Balkan Youth Championship

*Denotes draws include knockout matches decided on penalty shoot-out.
**Gold background colour indicates that the tournament was won.

Honours
Balkan Youth Championship
Winners (2): 1978, 1981

See also

 Albania national football team
 Albania national under-23 football team
 Albania national under-20 football team
 Albania national under-19 football team
 Albania national under-18 football team
 Albania national under-17 football team
 Albania national under-16 football team
 Albania national under-15 football team
 Albania national football team results
 Albania national youth football team
 Albanian Superliga
 Football in Albania
 List of Albania international footballers

References

External links
 Team profile at Soccerway
 Team profile at FSHF.org
 Team profile at UEFA.com

 
European national under-21 association football teams
Football in Albania